Ernie Collumbine (1938 – 19 June 2019) was a Scottish professional footballer who played as a wing half and sweeper.

Career
Born in Carronshore, Collumbine played for Bo'ness United, Stenhousemuir, East Stirlingshire (captaining the side to promotion to the First Division), St Johnstone and Clydebank.

References

1938 births
2019 deaths
Scottish footballers
Bo'ness United F.C. players
Stenhousemuir F.C. players
East Stirlingshire F.C. players
St Johnstone F.C. players
Clydebank F.C. (1965) players
Scottish Football League players
Association football wing halves
Association football sweepers